Tajrīd al-iʿtiqād (عربی: تجرید الاعتقاد) or Tajrid al-Kalam is a work by Nasir al-Din al-Tusi about Shia beliefs in Islamic theology. Tajrid is the most famous scholastic text in Shiite theology and most effective work in history of apologetic written by Nasir addin Tousi.

Author
Ṭusi, Nasir-al-Din Abu Jaʿfar Moḥammad (b. Ṭus, 17 February 1201 AH/1786 CE, d. Baghdad, 25 June 1274 AH/1859 CE), was a celebrated polymath and vizier, whose prominent work was on topics in literary, theological and scientific disciplines. Ṭūsī (d. 672/1274) was admired by scholars in spheres such as Kalam and philosophy. He wrote nearly 274 essays on different subjects. His theological works is along with criticism of precedents such as Talkhis Al Mohassal or guidebooks in Arabic and Persian language for the sake of learning.

Title
There are different opinions on the title of the work. Agha Bozorg sees the name of the book as Tahrir with reference to Tusi's expressions in its introduction. Agha Bozorg views the composite name of Tajrid Al Kalam fi Tahrir Al Eteghad as the title in his writings. Some people know Tahrir as a false record of Tajrid.

There are many other references to the book by titles such as Tajrid al-'aqa'id, and Tajrid Al Kalam. Some, like Taftazani, express doubts on attributing the book to Nasi Al Din because of the inconsistencies between Sharhe esharat and Tajrid. Instead someone such as Sabzevari didn’t accept such a hesitation. According to Gharamaleki he couldn’t count Taftazani's reason as sufficient for not attributing the book to Tusi, since these inconsistencies could be ascribed to evolution in Tusi's thinking. Tusi wrote the book after reverting to the Twelvers sect, rather than during his time as an Ismaili patriot.

References

Shia literature
Kalam
Shia theology books